Ride is the eighth album by jazz saxophonist Boney James, released in 2001. The album spawned the smooth jazz radio singles "RPM" and "See What I'm Sayin'?" and the Urban AC radio singles "Something Inside" with R&B singer Dave Hollister and "Ride" with R&B singer Jaheim.

Track listing

Personnel 
Musicians
 Boney James – all instruments (1), programming (1, 3), keyboards (2, 3, 4, 6, 7, 9, 10, 11), tenor saxophone (2, 3, 5-8, 10), wind synthesizer (2), soprano saxophone (4, 9, 11), vocoder (8), synth acoustic guitar (9), drum programming (9)
 Rex Rideout – acoustic piano (2), Fender Rhodes (2), keyboards (4, 5), programming (4)
 David Torkanowsky – keyboards (3), Rhodes piano (9), acoustic piano (11)
 David "Kahlid" Woods – keyboards (6, 8), programming (6, 8), guitars (8), backing vocals (8)
 Ian Prince – keyboards (7), programming (7), vocals (7)
 Carl Burnett – keyboards (10), programming (10)
 Leon Bisquera – additional keyboards (10)
 Chuck Cymone – programming (11), acoustic guitar (11)
 Paul Jackson Jr. – guitars (2, 5), acoustic guitar (9)
 Paul Brown – wah wah guitar (2), drum programming (9)
 Rohn Lawrence – guitars (3, 6), "uh-huh" voice (6)
 Charlie Singleton – guitars (7)
 Alex Al – bass (2, 5)
 Marcus Miller – bass (6)
 Larry Kimpel – bass (9)
 Ahmir "?uestlove" Thompson – drums (2, 5)
 Paulinho da Costa – percussion (2, 5, 6, 10)
 Lenny Castro – percussion (3, 7, 9)
 Andy Narell – steel drums (10)
 Luis Conte – percussion (11)
 Dan Higgins – tenor saxophone (2, 10), flute (2, 10), alto flute (5)
 Bill Reichenbach Jr. – trombone (2, 10), bass trumpet (5)
 Jerry Hey – trumpet (2, 10), flugelhorn (2, 5)
 Trina Broussard – lead and backing vocals (1)
 Johnny Britt – backing vocals (1)
 Dave Hollister – lead vocals (4)
 Caleb Simms – backing vocals (4)
 Carl Carwell – vocals (7)
 Sue Ann Carwell – vocals (7)
 Jaheim – lead vocals (8)

Arrangements
 Boney James (1-5, 9, 11)
 Jerry Hey – horn arrangements (2, 5, 10)
 Paul Brown (4, 6, 8, 9, 11)
 Rex Rideout (4, 5)
 Ronnie Garrett (5)
 David "Kahlid" Woods (6)
 Ian Prince (7)
 Teron Beal (8)
 David Torkanowsky (9)
 Carl Burnett (10)
 Chuck Cymone (11)

Production 
 Boney James – producer 
 Paul Brown – producer, recording 
 Ian Prince – additional producer (7)
 Russell Elevado – recording, mixing 
 Don Murray – recording 
 Andy Ackland – mix assistant 
 Shinobu Mitsuoka – mix assistant 
 Martin Christensen – Pro Tools engineer
 Koji Egawa – Pro Tools engineer 
 Chris Gehringer – mastering 
 Lexy Shroyer – production coordinator 
 Glenn Barry – design production 
 Andy Engel – art direction, design 
 Eric Heintz – digital rendering 
 Don Miller – photography 
 Direct Management Group, Inc. – management 

Studios
 Recorded at Electric Lady Studios (New York City, New York); Funky Joint Studios (Sherman Oaks, California); O'Henry Sound Studios and Alpha Studios (Burbank, California); Sunset Sound (Hollywood, California).
 Pro Tools recording at Schnee Studios (North Hollywood, California) and 57 Varieties Studio (Sherman Oaks, California).
 Mixed at Electric Lady Studios and O'Henry Sound Studios.
 Mastered at Sterling Sound (New York City, New York).

References

2001 albums
Warner Records albums
Boney James albums